Lela may refer to:

People
 Lela (footballer) (born 1962), Brazilian football player
 Lela Alston (born 1942), American politician
 Lela Autio (1927-2016), American modernist painter and sculptor
 Lela B. Njatin (born 1963), Slovene writer and visual artist
 Lela Bliss (1896-1980), American actress
 Lela Brooks (1908-1990), Canadian speed skater
 Lela Chichinadze (born 1988), Georgian footballer
 Lela Cole Kitson (1891-1970), American freelance writer
 Lela E. Buis, American writer, playwright, poet, and artist
 Lela E. Rogers (1891-1977), American journalist, film producer, film editor, and screenwriter
 Lela Evans, Canadian politician
 Lela Javakhishvili (born 1984), Georgian chess player
 Lela Karagianni (1898-1944), Greek resistance leader
 Lela Keburia (born 1976), Georgian politician and philologist
 Lela Lee, American actress and cartoonist
 Lela Loren (born 1980), American television and film actress
 Lela Mevorah (1898-1972), Serbian librarian and medicine professor
 Lela Murray (1887-1949), American businesswoman, community leader, and civil rights advocate
 Lela Pandak Lam (died 1877), current ruler of Rembau
 Lela Rochon (born 1964), American actress
 Lela Rose, American fashion designer
 Lela Swift (1919-2015), television director and producer
 Lela Tsurtsumia (born 1969), Georgian pop folk singer
 Lela Viola Barton (1901-1967), American botanist
 Lela Violão (1929-2009), Cape Verdean singer and composer

Places
 Leľa, a village and municipality in the Nové Zámky District in the Nitra Region of south-west Slovakia
 Lela, Kenya, a small town in western Kenya near Lake Victoria

Other uses
 Lela language, a Kainji language of Nigeria
 Lela (cannon), Malay cannon